Salvia chiapensis (Chiapas sage) is a herbaceous perennial native to the province of Chiapas, Mexico, growing between 7000 and 9500 feet elevation in cloud forests. It was introduced to horticulture in the 1980s, probably as a result of a collecting trip by the University of California Botanical Garden, Berkeley.

The  and  elliptic-shaped leaves are ivy-green, glossy, and deeply veined, growing widely spaced along the stem. The flowers are bright fuchsia, with 3–6 flowers growing in whorls, widely spaced along the inflorescence.

Notes

External links
 CalPhotos gallery

chiapensis
Flora of Mexico
Plants described in 1900